Solveig Ingersdatter Gulbrandsen (born 12 January 1981) is a Norwegian footballer currently playing for Kolbotn of the Toppserien. At club level she has previously represented Kolbotn, FC Gold Pride, Vålerenga Fotball Damer and Stabæk. With the Norwegian national team Gulbrandsen accrued 183 caps, scored 55 goals and won the 2000 Summer Olympics.

Club career
Hailing from the Oppegård area to the South-East of Oslo, Gulbrandsen started her career for Kolbotn. Her team became the Norwegian Cup holders after winning the Cup Final in November 2007.

In December 2008 Gulbrandsen announced her transfer to Stabæk Fotball Kvinner, formed from the bankrupt Asker FK and other players.

On 10 December 2009 FC Gold Pride in Santa Clara, California, playing in the WPS league, announced that Gulbrandsen had signed a contract to play and to take part in coaching and education, starting in March 2010. However, on 7 July 2010, FC Gold Pride announced that Gulbrandsen would be returning to Norway and Stabæk FK, effective after the club's 17 July match against Philadelphia. Gulbrandsen cited a desire to begin a transition to a post-soccer career in Norway for her decision.

After a successful autumn season with Stabæk in 2010 she announced her retirement as a football player and joined the Oslo club Vålerenga as an assistant trainer. She also announced that she was expecting her second child.

A highlight video of Gulbrandsen's last league match, in which she assisted two goals and Stabæk won the Toppserien league title, can be seen on line from the Norwegian channel TV 2. She retired from her club side Stabæk Fotball Kvinner after the 2010 season.

In the latter half of the 2011 season Gulbrandsen played some matches as a substitute for the first-division club Vålerenga, and was later hired as the team's assistant player coach. During 2012 and 2013 she played regularly for Vålerenga, who had been promoted into the Toppserien.

After another brief period of retirement, 33-year-old Gulbrandsen rejoined Stabæk as a player in September 2014. She had been working as a television pundit for TV 2 but agreed to help out her former team who had an injury crisis.

International career
In 1998 Gulbrandsen made her debut for the Norwegian National Team and made regular appearances until the end of 2010. She won a gold medal with the Norwegian national team in the 2000 Summer Olympics. In 2005 Norway reached the Final of the 2005 UEFA Women's Championship by beating Sweden 3–2, with Gulbrandsen scoring two goals and earning a yellow card for hoisting her shirt over her head after scoring the first goal.

Gulbrandsen took part in the FIFA Women's World Cup 2007 tournament in China, her third such tournament, when Norway achieved fourth place behind Germany, Brazil and the USA.

On 9 June 2008 she was named to the Norwegian roster for the 2008 Summer Olympics that was held in Beijing, China. Norway advanced to the quarter-finals where they lost to Brazil. Gulbrandsen was hit in a wrist early in the match but continued playing and discovered only afterwards that a bone had been broken.

Gulbrandsen was selected for Norway's team in the UEFA Women's Euro 2009 played in Finland. The team survived the group stage to beat Sweden 3–1 in the quarter-final, losing to Germany 3–1 in the semifinal. At the end of the tournament she announced it would be her last championship but she would continue playing to the end of the season at least. In October 2009 she announced that she had decided with her family to continue playing for another season.

Veteran national coach Even Pellerud selected Gulbrandsen in Norway's squad for UEFA Women's Euro 2013 in Sweden. In the final at Friends Arena, she had a second half penalty kick saved by Germany's goalkeeper Nadine Angerer. Anja Mittag's goal gave the Germans their sixth successive title.

International goals

Personal life
Gulbrandsen is the daughter of former Norway international footballer Terje Gulbrandsen and Inger Elise Johansen, a former Norwegian champion in Rhythmic Gymnastics. She is married to Espen Andreassen, a former football trainer in Kolbotn women's football club. On 8 June 2006 Solveig Gulbrandsen gave birth to her first child, a son named Theodor. Her second child was born on 19 June 2011, a daughter named Lilly. She is unrelated to the other footballer Ragnhild Gulbrandsen.

Honours

Club
 Toppserien: Winner 2002, 2005, 2006, 2010
 Norwegian Women's Cup: Winner 2007

Country

Norway
1999 FIFA Women's World Cup: Fourth place
2003 FIFA Women's World Cup: Quarter-final
2007 FIFA Women's World Cup: Fourth place
2015 FIFA Women's World Cup: Round of 16
2000 Summer Olympics in Sydney: Gold
2008 Summer Olympics in Beijing: Quarter-final
UEFA Women's Euro 2001: Semi-finals
UEFA Women's Euro 2005: Runners-up
UEFA Women's Euro 2009: Semi-finals
UEFA Women's Euro 2013: Runners-up

Individual
 UEFA Women's Championship All-Star Team: 2013

References

External links
 
 
 
 
 Stabæk Club Profile 
 
 

1981 births
Living people
Norwegian women's footballers
Norway women's international footballers
Olympic footballers of Norway
Footballers at the 2000 Summer Olympics
Olympic gold medalists for Norway
Footballers at the 2008 Summer Olympics
FIFA Century Club
Olympic medalists in football
Stabæk Fotball Kvinner players
Kolbotn Fotball players
Vålerenga Fotball Damer players
FC Gold Pride players
Women's Professional Soccer players
Expatriate women's soccer players in the United States
1999 FIFA Women's World Cup players
2003 FIFA Women's World Cup players
2007 FIFA Women's World Cup players
2015 FIFA Women's World Cup players
Norwegian expatriate women's footballers
Norwegian expatriate sportspeople in the United States
Footballers from Oslo
Toppserien players
Women's association football midfielders
Medalists at the 2000 Summer Olympics